Chervena skala is a village in Ardino Municipality, Kardzhali Province, southern-central Bulgaria. It covers an area of 2.195 square kilometres and as of 2007 had a population of 87 people.

References

Villages in Kardzhali Province